The Jacob Wentz House is a historic building located in Iowa City, Iowa, United States.  Wentz was a German immigrant and a shoemaker by trade.  This is one of the few native stone houses in Iowa City, and being two stories, rarer still.  It is a fine example of the Greek Revival style, featuring symmetrical
openings, dressed stone lintels, and a bracketed entablature.  Originally a single family residence, it was converted into apartments and it now houses a retail business.  The house was listed on the National Register of Historic Places in 1974.

References

Houses completed in 1847
Greek Revival houses in Iowa
Houses in Iowa City, Iowa
National Register of Historic Places in Iowa City, Iowa
Houses on the National Register of Historic Places in Iowa